Jens Rasmussen may refer to:
 Jens Rasmussen (human factors expert), Danish professor at Risø
 Jens Rasmussen (speedway rider) from Denmark (born 1959)
 Jens Eilstrup Rasmussen, Danish inventor
 Jens Elmegård Rasmussen (1944–2013), Danish associate professor of Indo-European Studies
 Jens Erik Carl Rasmussen, (1841-1893), Danish painter
 Jens Sebastian Rasmussen, Filipino footballer